Amos Edwin Botsford,  (September 25, 1804 – March 19, 1894) was a Canadian farmer, judge, politician, and businessman.

Born in Saint John, New Brunswick, the son of William Botsford, and moved with his family to Westcock in 1808. He was a justice of the peace and a senior judge for the Inferior Court of Common Pleas in Westmorland County. He served in the county militia, reaching the rank of lieutenant-colonel. Botsford was named to the province's Legislative Council, serving from 1833 to 1866; he also served as a member of the Executive Council from 1838 to 1840. He supported Confederation and, in 1867, he was appointed to the Senate representing the senatorial division of New Brunswick. He served as speaker in 1872 and 1880. A Conservative member, he died in office in 1894. He is buried in Fernhill Cemetery.

Botsford also helped establish the New Brunswick and Prince Edward Railway Company in 1874 and served as its president. Lieutenant Colonel Botsford was the founding President of the Dominion of Canada Rifle Association in 1868.

References

External links

 
 
 

1804 births
1894 deaths
Canadian Anglicans
Canadian senators from New Brunswick
Conservative Party of Canada (1867–1942) senators
Members of the King's Privy Council for Canada
Speakers of the Senate of Canada
Members of the Legislative Council of New Brunswick
Members of the Executive Council of New Brunswick
Colony of New Brunswick people
Canadian justices of the peace